Love Me in Black is the sixth solo album of the German female hard rock singer Doro Pesch. It was released in 1998, after the dissolution of her contract with Polygram/Vertigo. Her new label WEA decided to publish the album only in Europe.

Overview
Love Me in Black is the first album released by Doro after her split from the PolyGram/Vertigo label, which had published all her works since 1985. Her new label WEA left her ample freedom for the making of her new album and she worked on it for more than two years, splitting its production in two teams. The first team was formed by the successful American producers and musicians Jimmy Harry and Fred Maher, the second team by former members of the German industrial rock band Die Krupps Jürgen Engler and Chris Lietz, who had already collaborated on Doro's previous album Machine II Machine and on the following EP of remixes.

The result of this double approach to production is surprisingly homogeneous, combining a heavier guitar sound than in the previous albums with plenty of electronic vibes, samples and a large use of drum machines and sequencers. The usual mix of ballads and hard rock songs featured in any Doro album takes on Love Me in Black an industrial and almost experimental spin, which also involves the vocals of the German singer, charged with many effects and distortions.

WEA did not consider the album appropriate for the US market and published it only in Germany, much to Doro's chagrin.

The song "Love Me in Black" was released in EP format and remains a staple in Doro's live show.

The song "Barracuda" is a cover of the Heart's hit single from their album Little Queen of 1977.

The album peaked at position No. 38 on the German Longplay chart.

Track listing

Credits
 Doro Pesch – vocals

Tracks 1, 2, 3, 6, 8, 11, 13, 14
 Jimmy Harry – guitars, bass, keyboards, programming, drum programming, producer, mixing except track 8, engineer
 Fred Maher – programming, producer except track 13, engineer
 Damon Weber – drums
 Nick Douglas – bass
 Andrew Goodsight – bass
 John Parthum – engineer on track 3
 Lloyd Puckitt – engineer on track 3
 Chris Lord-Alge – mixing on track 8

Tracks 4, 5, 7, 9, 10
 Jürgen Engler – guitars, keyboards, bass, producer
 Chris Lietz – drum programming, keyboards, producer, engineer
 Jeff Bova – additional production on track 10
 Jimmy Bralower – additional production on track 10

References

External links
American site
"Love Me in Black" video clip

Doro (musician) albums
1998 albums
Warner Music Group albums